= ICE Washington Field Office =

Coordinates: 38.9115°N 77.4587°W

US Immigration and Customs Enforcement (ICE) operates a Washington Field Office in Chantilly, Virginia, which is one of twenty-five coordinating locations for its Enforcement and Removal Operations.

The office includes a temporary holding facility for detained immigrants. In 2025, a shift ICE shifted policy allowing such facilities, previously limited to holding detainees for no more than 12 hours, to house them for up to three days. The Washington Field Office, which has no beds for detainees, held 40 to 90 detainees in a single room for multiple days in August and September 2025. The three-day limit was often exceeded according to an attorney for the National Immigration Project. After a month of attempting to get access to the facility, US Congress members visited the facility on September 26, 2025, and reported somewhat improved conditions.
